Ra'ad bin Zeid (born 18 February 1936) is the son of Prince Zeid of the Hashemite House and Princess Fahrelnissa Zeid (Fakhr un-nisa or Fahr-El-Nissa), a Turkish noblewoman. His father died on October 18, 1970, leaving him in charge of the former Royal Houses of Iraq. Ra'ad has lived in London and Paris.

Early life 
Raad was born in Berlin, where his father was Iraqi ambassador at the time. He is an agnatic grandson of king Hussein of Hejaz, his father prince Zeid being king Hussein's youngest son. As such he is a first cousin of kings Talal of Jordan and Ghazi of Iraq.

Raad's paternal first cousin once removed was Faisal II, the last king of Iraq, who was killed at the age of 23 in a bloody coup d'état on 14 July 1958 (Crown Prince Abd-al-Illah was also killed). Following the revolution, Prince Zeid, Raad's father, was recognized as the Head of the Royal House of Iraq by his remaining agnatic co-heirs of Jordan. They continued to live in London, where the family resided during the coup, as Zeid was the Iraqi ambassador there.

Raad himself succeeded his father as all such at the latter's death in 1970 in exile in France.

Education and career 
He was educated in Alexandria, Egypt, and at Christ's College, Cambridge, where he graduated BA in 1960, promoted to MA in 1963.

After receiving his Cambridge degree, Raad was appointed as Chamberlain of the Royal Court of Jordan, in Amman, and afterwards worked there in civil administration and charitable organizations. He was an aide and a close confidant of his cousins kings Hussein and Abdullah II of Jordan.

Marriage and children 
Prince Raad married at Södertälje, Sweden, 30 June 1963 (civil), and at the Royal Palace, Amman, on 5 August 1963, Swedish-born Margaretha Inga Elisabeth Lind, henceforward known as Majda Ra'ad, President of Al-Hussein Society and Director of Bandak Foundation, born in Arboga on 5 September 1942, daughter of Sven Gustav Lind and wife Carin Inga Birgitta Gunlaug Grönwall, daughter of Eugen Assar Alexius Grönwall and wife, Signe Maria Svensson, and an illegitimate descendant of the House of Vasa through King Charles XI of Sweden. They have five children:

 Zeid bin Ra'ad - Jordanian diplomat, served as United Nations High Commissioner for Human Rights from 2014 to 2018. Born 26 January 1964, married to Sarah Butler They have 3 children, Ra'ad bin Zeid (born 17 May 2001), Hala bint Zeid (born 13 March 2003) and Azizah.
 Mired bin Ra'ad - born 11 June 1965, married to Dina Khalifeh. They have 3 children, Shirin bint Mir'ed (born 19 May 1993), Rakan bin Mir'ed (born 20 November 1995) and Jafar bin Mir'ed (Born:  4 September 2002).
 Firas bin Ra'ad - born 12 October 1969, married to Dana Nabil Toukan. They have 3 children, Safa (born 26 July 2001), Haya (born 7 March 2003) and Hashem (born 31 October 2010).
She worked with MSNBC NBC News in Baghdad covering the Iraq war. She's the daughter of Munjid Sukhtian. They have 3 children, Hanan (born 3 September 2006), Mariam (born: 25 July 2008) and Hussein (born April 2013).
 Fakhrelnissa bint Ra'ad - born 11 January 1981, graduated from Brown University in 2002 and UCL in 2004. Artist known as Nissa Raad. Married in 2005 (divorced in 2017). She has 3 children, Radwan Hajjar (born 8 August 2006), Faisal Hajjar (born 14 December 2007) and a daughter Lana Hajjar (born 30 April 2012).

Royal House of Iraq 
Prince Raad's position as the head of the Royal House of Iraq was in contention with Sharif Ali Bin al-Hussein (a descendant of Hussein of Hejaz's granddaughter, sister and male cousin, but not in male line from king Hussein) who was another pretender to the Iraqi throne and the leader of the Iraqi Constitutional Monarchy, until the latter's death on 14 March 2022.

Ancestry

Honour
 Malaysia: Honorary Commander of the Order of the Defender of the Realm (P.M.N.) (1965)

References

External links
 Ra'ad bin Zeid

1936 births
People from Berlin
House of Hashim
Honorary Knights Grand Cross of the Royal Victorian Order
Politics of Iraq
Pretenders to the Iraqi throne
Alumni of Christ's College, Cambridge
Living people
Knights Grand Cross of the Order of Isabella the Catholic
Commandeurs of the Légion d'honneur
Grand Cross of the Ordre national du Mérite
Recipients of the Order of the Sacred Treasure, 1st class
Knights Grand Cross of the Order of Merit of the Italian Republic
Commanders Grand Cross of the Order of the Polar Star
Grand Cordons of the Order of Independence (Jordan)
Grand Officers of the Order of Leopold II
Recipients of the Grand Decoration with Sash for Services to the Republic of Austria
Honorary Commanders of the Order of the Defender of the Realm